The 2019–20 American Athletic Conference men's basketball season began with practices in October 2019 followed by the start of the 2019–20 NCAA Division I men's basketball season in November. The conference held its media day in October 2019. Conference play began in December 2019 and concluded in March 2020.

Head coaches

Coaching changes 
Cincinnati hired former Northern Kentucky coach John Brannen after coach Mick Cronin departed for the same role at UCLA.
Tulane fired Mike Dunleavy after 3 seasons and replaced him with former Georgia State head coach Ron Hunter.
Temple head coach Fran Dunphy retired at the end of the 2018–19 season and was succeeded  by assistant coach and Temple alum Aaron McKie.

Coaches 

Notes:
 Overall and AAC records are from time at current school and are through the end of 2019–20 season. NCAA records include time at current school only.
 AAC records only, prior conference records not included.
*In current job

Preseason

Preseason Coaches Poll 
The AAC Coaches poll was released on October 14, 2019, with the Cougars predicted to finish first in the AAC.

Preseason All-AAC Teams

Regular season

Rankings

Conference matrix 
This table summarizes the head-to-head results between teams in conference play. Each team will play 18 conference games: one game vs. four opponents and two games against seven opponents.

Note: table updated through end of 2019–20 season

Player of the week
Throughout the regular season, the American Athletic Conference named a player and rookie of the week.

Honors and awards

All-AAC Awards and Teams
* Unanimous Selection

Postseason

American Athletic Conference tournament

Due to the coronavirus pandemic the tournament was cancelled on March 12, 2020 – only minutes before the first game was set to begin.

NCAA Tournament 

On March 12, the tournament, as well as all other postseason tournaments for the remainder of the academic season,  was cancelled in the wake of the coronavirus pandemic. It was the first time the tournament had been cancelled since its creation in 1939.

NBA draft
The following list includes all AAC players who were drafted in the 2020 NBA draft.

References